Andrez Simon Bergen is an Australian musician and writer. , Bergen lived in Tokyo, Japan with his wife, Yoko Umehara, and their daughter Cocoa. He has performed and released electronic music as Little Nobody.

Biography 

Andrez Simon Bergen, was born in Melbourne. With his friends Brian Huber and Mateusz Sikora established a record label, IF? Records in 1995 in Melbourne. As Little Nobody, he worked as a DJ and issued an album, Pop Tart in September 1998 on his label. One of its tracks is "Tobacco-Stained Mountain Goat".

In April 2011 Bergen published his first novel, Tobacco-Stained Mountain Goat, via Another Sky Press. Nalini Haynes of Dark Matter Zine observed it is written in a "pseudo-stream-of-consciousness style" and warns that it "requires the reader to be familiar with numerous films from the mid-twentieth century." His second novel, One Hundred Years of Vicissitude, appeared in the following year. It "is by turns educational, inspiring, traumatic and humorous" according to Fantasy Book Reviews Floresiensis.

Bibliography

Novels

Short stories

 

Black/White (2014)

References

External links 
 

Australian expatriates in Japan
Living people
Musicians from Melbourne
Year of birth missing (living people)